The Ministry of Finance of the Republic of Maldives (Dhivehi: މިނިސްޓްރީ އޮފް ފައިނޭންސް) is the ministry responsible for managing the public finances of the Maldives.

History
The Finance Ministry was established in 1932 under the Arabic name Vuzaaraathul Maaliyya to handle the Sultanate of the Maldives' financial affairs.

Ministers of Finance
 Abdul Majeed Rannaban’deyri Kilegefaanu, 11 March 1903 to 14 October 1932
 Hassan Farid Didi, 22 December 1932 to 18 January 1942
 Mohamed Amin Didi, 18 January 1942 to 31 December 1952
 Ibrahim Muhammad Didi, 12 July 1954 to 27 November 1955
 Ibrahim Faamudheyri Kilegefaanu, 27 November 1955 to 14 December 1957
 Ibrahim Nasir, 14 December 1957 to 11 November 1968
 Abdul Sattar Moosa Didi, 29 October 1970 to 10 March 1975
 Mohamed Nooruddin, 7 July 1976 to 11 November 1978
 Maumoon Abdul Gayyoom, 11 November 1978 to 5 January 1989
 Ismail Fathy, 5 January 1989 to 11 November 1993
 Arif Hilmy, 11 November 1993 to 31 May 2000
 Mohamed Jaleel, 1 June 2000 to 14 July 2005
 Qasim Ibrahim, 18 August 2005 to 15 July 2008
 Abdulla Jihad, 15 July 2008 to 11 November 2008
 Ali Hashim, 12 November 2008 to 12 December 2010
 Ahmed Inaz, 10 April 2011 to 29 December 2011
 Mohamed Shihab, 4 January 2012 to 8 February 2012
 Abdulla Jihad, 5 March 2012 to 22 June 2016
 Ahmed Munawar, 22 June 2016 to 15 November 2018
 Ibrahim Ameer, 17 November 2018 to date

References

Politics of the Maldives
Political organisations based in the Maldives
Maldives
1932 establishments in the British Empire